Mia Clarke (born 20 March 1983) is an English guitarist from the alternative rock band Electrelane and an entrepreneur. She was born in Brighton, England and following a short period living in the Czech Republic moved to Chicago, United States in 2008

She formed a new band, Follows, in 2008 in Chicago with members of Russian Circles, Bloodiest, and Atombombpocketknife. Clarke has collaborated with Canadian hip hop artist Buck 65, contributing guitar to his Dirtbike 3/3 project.

In April 2008, Clarke flew to Amsterdam to record a guitar improvisation with Andy Moor of The Ex. Their collaboration "Guitargument" was released digitally by File Thirteen Records on 17 February 2009 and as a CD edition by hellosQuare recordings in late 2010.

She is also a freelance writer and has written about music for publications including The Wire, The Guardian, and Pitchfork Media. From 2009 to 2013, Clarke wrote a column on Chicago's classical music scene for Time Out Chicago. She then established a career as a copywriter and creative strategist.

In 2019, she co-founded a women's wellbeing brand, Nyssa.

References

External links
 Electrelane.com - Official band website
 Too Pure: Electrelane
 Beggars Group: Electrelane
 https://web.archive.org/web/20080928194335/http://www.pitchforkmedia.com/article/feature/43815-guest-list-electrelane

1983 births
Living people
Women rock singers
English rock guitarists
English women guitarists
21st-century English women singers
21st-century English singers
21st-century British guitarists
21st-century women guitarists